Károly Sugar (1882–1936) was a Hungarian stage and film actor. Most of his career was spent in the theatre, but he also appeared in five films.

Selected filmography
 The Old Scoundrel (1932)
 And the Plains Are Gleaming (1933)

References

Bibliography
 Rachel A. Schildgen. More Than a Dream: Rediscovering the Life and Films of Vilma Banky. 1921 PVG Publishing, 2010.

External links

1882 births
1936 deaths
Hungarian male film actors
Hungarian male stage actors
Male actors from Budapest